No Frills was a television sitcom broadcast on BBC1 in 1988, and consisted of 7 episodes. It starred Kathy Staff as Molly Bickerstaff, a recently widowed woman who moves from Oldham to live in London with her divorced daughter Kate (Belinda Sinclair) and goth granddaughter Suzy (Katharine Schlesinger).

External links

BBC television sitcoms
1988 British television series debuts
1988 British television series endings
Television shows set in London